Jeffrey Lee Reynolds (born September 7, 1956) is an American college basketball coach.  He is a special assistant basketball coach under Brad Brownell at Clemson.  Reynolds served as the head men's basketball coach at North Carolina Wesleyan College in 1985–96, Wingate University from 1997 to 2000, and the United States Air Force Academy from 2007 to 2012.

Early life and playing career
Born in Mountain City, Tennessee, Reynolds played college basketball at Surry Community College from 1974 to 1976 then at UNC Greensboro from 1976 to 1978. As a junior in 1976–77, Reynolds averaged 6.3 points.

Coaching career
From 1978 to 1980, Reynolds was assistant coach at Carroll County High School in Hillsville, Virginia, before being promoted to head coach for the 1980–81 season.

Reynolds started his college coaching career at James Madison University in 1981, serving as a part-time assistant. He also served as an assistant coach at  Randolph-Macon College from 1982 to 1985, Winthrop from 1986 to 1990, UNCW from 1990 to 1994, UNC Greensboro from 1994 to 1997, and Tulane from 2002 to 2007.

Reynolds was a head coach at the Division III level at NC Wesleyan in the 1985–86 season and Division II level at Wingate University from 1997 to 2000 and the Division III level.

After two seasons as an assistant coach at the United States Air Force Academy, in April 2007 Reynolds was named to succeed Jeff Bzdelik as head coach.  Athletic director Hans Mueh said he was "absolutely blown away by (Reynolds’) passion, emotion and vision." In five seasons, Reynolds guided the Falcons to one postseason appearance and was one of only two coaches in program history with multiple conference tournament wins. He was fired on February 8, 2012.

Reynolds then became Director of Men's Basketball Operations at Marquette, where he served from 2012 to 2014 before taking his current position with Virginia Tech.  While at Marquette, the Golden Eagles advanced to the Elite Eight of the NCAA men's basketball tournament.

Head coaching record

Notes

References

External links
 Air Force profile

1956 births
Living people
Air Force Falcons men's basketball coaches
American men's basketball coaches
American men's basketball players
Basketball players from Tennessee
Basketball coaches from Tennessee
College men's basketball head coaches in the United States
High school basketball coaches in the United States
James Madison Dukes men's basketball coaches
Junior college men's basketball players in the United States
North Carolina Wesleyan Battling Bishops men's basketball coaches
People from Mountain City, Tennessee
Randolph–Macon Yellow Jackets men's basketball coaches
Texas A&M Aggies men's basketball coaches
Tulane Green Wave men's basketball coaches
UNC Greensboro Spartans men's basketball coaches
UNC Greensboro Spartans men's basketball players
UNC Wilmington Seahawks men's basketball coaches
Wingate Bulldogs men's basketball coaches
Winthrop Eagles men's basketball coaches
Guards (basketball)